San Francisco District is a district (distrito) of Veraguas Province in Panama. The population according to the 2010 Panamanian census was 9,881; the latest official estimate (for 2019) is 10,536. The district covers a total area of 437 km². The capital lies at the town of San Francisco.

Administrative divisions
San Francisco District is divided administratively into the following corregimientos:

San Francisco de la Montaña
Corral Falso
Los Hatillos
Remance
San Juan
San José

References

Districts of Panama
Veraguas Province